Michael Præst (born 25 July 1986) is a Danish professional football player in the defender position, who currently plays for KR Reykjavíkur in the Úrvalsdeild.

Career
On 1 September 2007 he signed a 2-year contract with Vejle Boldklub, after playing in the club as a youth player. He made his debut for Vejle in August 2008, and went on to play five games and score one goal for the club, including two league games. He was loaned out to Kolding FC in January 2009, and signed a permanent contract with the club in July 2009. He prolonged his Kolding deal in January 2010.

References

Præst skal hjælpe KR til mesterskab‚ bold.dk, 23 October 2015

External links

1986 births
Living people
Danish men's footballers
Vejle Boldklub players
Kolding FC players
FC Fyn players
Stjarnan players
Knattspyrnufélag Reykjavíkur players
Úrvalsdeild karla (football) players
Danish expatriate men's footballers
Expatriate footballers in Iceland
Danish expatriate sportspeople in Iceland
Association football defenders
People from Vejle Municipality
Sportspeople from the Region of Southern Denmark